Epacris myrtifolia is a species of flowering plant in the heath family Ericaceae and is endemic to Tasmania. The flowers are arranged singly in a few upper leaf axils with many leathery bracts at the base.

Epacris heteronema was first formally described in 1805 by Jacques Labillardière in his Novae Hollandiae Plantarum Specimen.

This epacris grows in exposed coastal scrub in the south-east of Tasmania.

References

myrtifolia
Ericales of Australia
Flora of Tasmania
Plants described in 1805